Building 6981 is a historic ammunition magazine located at Camp Shelby, Mississippi.  Constructed in 1917, it is the only building at Camp Shelby still standing from the WWI era.  The building was placed on the National Register of Historic Places in 1992 and was designated a Mississippi Landmark in 1995.

Description
The outer walls are poured concrete over wire mesh.

The interior walls are paneled with pine boards that run horizontally, up to the top of two door frames that are centered in the north and south facades. The south facing doors are covered in sheet metal.

The roof is also concrete, poured over wire mesh, and was constructed with a clerestory-style raised center for ventilation. Access to the south entrance doors was provided by poured concrete steps, but a concrete ramp was constructed to facilitate ADA accessibility.

Location
Building 6981 was originally located in an undeveloped wooded area of Camp Shelby at coordinates .  The building was relocated approximately  onto the grounds of the Mississippi Armed Forces Museum and is the oldest structure at Camp Shelby, dating from the WWI era.

References 

Mississippi Landmarks
National Register of Historic Places in Forrest County, Mississippi
Magazines (artillery)
Government buildings completed in 1917
Military facilities on the National Register of Historic Places in Mississippi
Camp Shelby